Durant Hotham (1617?–1691), was a biographer.

Biography
Hotham was fifth son by his second marriage of Sir John Hotham, of Scorborough, Yorkshire He was admitted to Christ's College, Cambridge, 7 May 1632, aged 15.

Hotham  became involved in his father's and elder brother's (John Hotham, the younger) disgrace, his letters and papers were seized (June 1643), and he was summoned to attend parliament. After being examined, he was soon discharged, and his property restored to him, though he received strict injunctions not to join his father.

For many years he lived at Lockington in the East Riding of Yorkshire, engaged in scientific pursuits. As justice of the peace he officiated at the marriage of his brother Charles at Wigan on 15 September 1656. He died in the parish of St James, Westminster, in 1691, and was buried in the church

Works
He wrote a "Life of Jacob Boehme", published in two different editions in 1654, interesting for its literary style. His translation of his brother Charles's "Ad Philosophiam Teutonicam Manuductio" was issued in 1650 as "englished by D. F". (i.e. Durant Frater).

Family
On 23 August 1645 Hotham  married Frances (1625–1693), daughter of Richard Remington of Lund, Yorkshire, and with her had seven sons and four daughters, all of whom died young.

Notes

References
 Endnotes:
.
Cal. State Papers, Dom. 1652–3, p. 405.
Dalton's Wrays of Glenworth, ii. 60.
information supplied by C. W. Sutton, esq., of Manchester.

1617 births
1691 deaths
People from Leconfield
Younger sons of baronets